Martino Cignaroli (1649 – January 10, 1726) was an Italian painter of the Baroque period. He was the elder son of Giambettino Cignaroli's uncle.

Biography
Also called il Veronese, he was born and studied in Verona with Giulio Carpioni. He mainly painted both religious frescoes and landscapes. His landscapes are described as populated with small figures in a Flemish style. He worked in Crema and Milan, until 1714 when he was asked to paint for the court of King of Sardinia, then in Turin. He traveled there with Scipione.

His Cignaroli family line produced over a dozen artists and artisans. Martino's son Scipione became a pupil of Pieter Mulier II (Cavalier Tempesta). Martino's grandson, Vittorio Amedeo Cignaroli (1730–1800), was a known landscape painter for the House of Savoy in Turin. Martino's great grandson Angelo Cignaroli, was a painter of veduta, died in 1842. Another pupil of Martino was Giovanni Murari.

References

Sant Ambrogio Basilica website

1649 births
1726 deaths
17th-century Italian painters
Italian male painters
18th-century Italian painters
Baroque painters
Painters from Verona
18th-century Italian male artists